Aeroflot Flight 3630 was a regularly scheduled passenger flight operated by Aeroflot from Mineralnye Vody Airport to Vilnius Airport with a stop over at Rostov-on-Don Airport. On 2 September 1970, the Tu-124 operating this flight crashed after a loss of control at cruise altitude, 42 minutes after take off from Rostov-on-Don Airport. All 32 passengers and five crew members were killed. 

The Air Accident Investigation Commission was unable to discover the root cause of the accident.

Accident
After a brief stopover, Flight 3630 departed Rostov-on-Don Airport at 14:55 Moscow time and at 15:14 reported passing over Donetsk at 8,400 meters. Then at 15:37 controllers received a short message from flight 3630 consisting of "Forty Five - Zero - Twelve" with the word twelve spoken with a frantic inflection. This was the last contact with the flight.

Aircraft
Construction of the Tu-124 involved, serial number 1350402 04-02, was completed at production factory 135 in Kharkiv, Ukraine, on 30 September 1961 and it was transferred to the civil air fleet. At the time of the accident, the aircraft had sustained a total of 7,504 flight hours and 6,996 cycles.

Investigation
The aircraft created a deep cone-shaped crater at impact, destroying much of the airframe. The flight data recorder was damaged beyond recovery of any data but the Air Accident Investigation Commission were able to determine that the engines were set to idle power, the flaps, spoilers and landing gear were all in the retracted position and that rudder trim was full right with the left aileron trim full up. 

Weather along the flight route was calm and ruled out as a possible cause. 

Investigators looked into the possibility that the aircraft collided in flight with an unmanned military vehicle or a weather balloon but no evidence surfaced. The commission found no evidence of an in flight aircraft failure or structural break up. The right engine and other sections of the aircraft displayed damage due to fire and investigators considered that a fire in flight may have caused the accident. An examination of the victims found no smoke had been inhaled and further analysis of the crash site determined all fire damage occurred during the post crash fire so this possibility was ruled out. 

The investigators were able to conclude that full deflection of the rudder and left aileron trim would have significant effects on control of the aircraft at cruising speed but the chain of events leading to the accident was never determined.

See also
Aeroflot accidents and incidents
Aeroflot accidents and incidents in the 1970s

References

Accidents and incidents involving the Tupolev Tu-124
Aviation accidents and incidents in 1970
Aviation accidents and incidents in the Soviet Union
3630
1970 in the Soviet Union
1970 in Ukraine
History of Dnipropetrovsk Oblast
Aviation accidents and incidents in Ukraine